"Beautiful Goodbye" (styled as "Beautiful goodbye") is a song recorded by South Korean singer Chen. It was released as a single to promote Chen's debut extended play April, and a Flower on April 1, 2019.

The song was a commercial success, peaking at number four on South Korea's Gaon Digital Chart.

Background and release 
"Beautiful Goodbye", composed by MooF and Jisoo Park, is described as a piano-backed ballad, with lyrics about a man preparing to say goodbye to his failing relationship.

Music video 
On April 1, 2019, the official music video of "Beautiful Goodbye" was released. The video shows Chen performing in a middle of a dry, barren land and is accompanied by a veiled female pianist. Later on, the two are joined by veiled female dancers.

Promotion 
Chen started promoting "Beautiful Goodbye" on Korean music programs for one week starting from April 5, 2019.

Accolades

Charts

Weekly charts

Year-end charts

References 

2019 singles
2019 songs
2010s ballads
Korean-language songs
Pop ballads
SM Entertainment singles